Bandera Volcano Ice Cave, also known as Zuni Ice Cave, is a lava tube cave in New Mexico with an internal temperature significantly less than above-ground summertime ambient temperature; it contains perennial ice. Some areas of the ice cave never reach above freezing. For years, local Indigenous people used the cave to store food.

Geology
The lava tube was formed during the Bandera Crater eruption sometime between 9,500 and 10,900 years ago, during one of the many basaltic eruptions  in the Zuni-Bandera volcanic field over the past million years. The crater's cinder cone is 900-feet high reaching 8,309 feet above sea level.

The eruption produced numerous formations in addition to lava tubes including a cinder cone, collapse pits, spatter cones and spine. The type of lava is ʻAʻā  which is more viscous than pāhoehoe. There are many lava tubes and several ice caves in the area including Giant Ice Cave. One has been developed as a commercial ice cave near the Candelaria Trading Post. Lava tubes in the area, "some dating back 115,000 years, formed a network of underground tubes stretching for 17 miles — the longest such system in the continental United States."

Location

The cave system is located in the El Malpais lava field within the boundaries of El Malpais National Monument. The cave's location is N34° 59.556', W108° 04.926'.

Gallery

References

Caves of New Mexico
Lava caves
Lava tubes
Geology of New Mexico